James Paul Hendren (born August 12, 1963) is an American politician serving as a member of the Arkansas Senate from the 2nd district. From January 2019 to January 2021, he also served as Senate Majority Leader. Until February 2021, he was a Republican; but he has left his party in the wake of the 2021 storming of the United States Capitol. He resides in Sulphur Springs in Benton County in Northwest Arkansas.

Early life and education

A native of Gravette in Benton County, Hendren spent a semester at Bob Jones University and graduated in 1984 with a degree in electrical engineering from the University of Arkansas at Fayetteville.

Career 
From 1984 to 1992, he served in the United States Air Force. A former F-15 fighter pilot, he flew in six intercepts of planes of the former Soviet Union over the Bering Sea. Since 2003, he has been a senior offensive duty guard in the Arkansas Air National Guard. He owns Hendren Plastics Company. He and his wife, Tammy Claire Hendren (born 1964), have four children, Daniel, David, Nick, and Molly. He is a Baptist.

Arkansas Legislature
Hendren was elected to the Gravette School Board in 1992.

In 1994, Hendren defeated Representative Railey Steele in a race for the Arkansas House of Representatives. He remained a state representative until 2000. During this time, he worked for passage of several pieces of anti-abortion legislation, including a ban on partial birth abortions in 1996 and the Fetal Protection Law of 1999.

In 2001, Hendren ran unsuccessfully to succeed his uncles, Asa Hutchinson and Tim Hutchinson, representing Arkansas's 3rd congressional district in a special election campaign that was hampered by reports of an extramarital affair. Hendren finished third in the Republican primary.

In 2003, Hendren returned to military service and joined the Missouri Air National Guard, of which he holds the rank of lieutenant colonel.

In 2012, Hendren ran unopposed for the state Senate; his initial four-year term expired on December 31, 2016. Re-elected in the 2016 election, Hendren served on the Education Facilities Oversight Committee and the Arkansas Legislative Council. He was a member of four other Senate committees: Budget, Children & Youth, Education, and Energy . Hendren passed legislation exempting all active duty and National Guard personnel from state income tax in 2013. He was also appointed chairman of a Joint Task Force charged with reforming public school and Arkansas State Employee Insurance programs.

In January 2021, Hendren stepped down as the state's Senate Majority Leader. On February 19, in interview with MSNBC, he officially disaffiliated from the Republican Party, re-registering as an independent, citing the party's lack of safety and increased partisanship particularly in the 2021 storming of the United States Capitol, and announced that he would form a new organization to be called "Common Ground Arkansas".

Controversies
In 2020, a Federal judge ordered Hendren Plastics and DARP Foundation to pay more than $1.1 million in back wages and damages to workers who were forced to work without pay at Hendren Plastics. District Judge Timothy Brooks wrote that “They were businesses that manipulated the labor market and skirted compliance with the labor laws for their own private ends,” The DARP Foundation was a work-based rehab in which many participants had their participation court ordered in lieu of incarceration. DARP supplied workers to Hendren's Hendren Plastics who used them as a “captive workforce.” Not only was the misuse of rehab workers abusive but it also displaced private sector employees at Hendren Plastics who had enjoyed a significantly higher wage than the temporary laborers. Injuries to the workers at Hendren Plastics were commonplace with seriously injured workers being kicked out of the program and sent to prison, this created an incentive to massively underreport workplace injuries.

Personal life
His father, Kim Hendren, is a former member of the Arkansas Senate and in a second stint in office a member of the Arkansas House of Representatives from 2015 to 2017. His sister, Gayla Hendren McKenzie, served in the State House, but retired to run for State Senate in 2022. Another sister, Hope Hendren Duke, is running for State House in 2022. Through his mother, the former Marylea Hutchinson, his cousins include fellow State Senator Jeremy Hutchinson and former State Representative Timothy Chad Hutchinson, sons of former Senator Tim Hutchinson, and Hutchinson's first wife, Donna.

References

|-

|-

|-

1963 births
21st-century American politicians
Arkansas Independents
Arkansas Republicans
Arkansas state senators
Baptists from Arkansas
Businesspeople from Arkansas
Hutchinson family
Living people
Members of the Arkansas House of Representatives
People from Gravette, Arkansas
School board members in Arkansas
United States Air Force officers
University of Arkansas alumni